George Harold Swift (3 February 1870 – 1956) was an English footballer who won the FA Cup with Wolverhampton Wanderers, and was later the first secretary-manager of Southampton.

Playing career
Swift was born in Oakengates, Shropshire and spent his early club career with Stoke and Crewe Alexandra, before he joined Football League club Wolverhampton Wanderers in 1891. He made his Wolves debut on 14 September 1891 in a 5–0 win over Accrington, one of four appearances that season.

He was an ever-present in the 1892–93 season, which included the club winning their first ever FA Cup when they defeated Everton in the final. He moved to Loughborough after the subsequent season and later played at Leicester Fosse, Notts County and Leeds City before retiring in 1906.

He represented England against Ireland in the Inter-League match at the Victoria Ground, Stoke-on-Trent, in November 1895.

Coaching and management career

Chesterfield
After retiring from playing, he became trainer at Leeds City where he stayed for two seasons. Swift had a good deal of influence on onfield activities and gave manager Gilbert Gillies great support before taking the post of manager at Chesterfield in summer 1907. He spent three years at Chesterfield, with no conspicuous success. In his first season in charge, Chesterfield finished second from bottom of Football League Second Division but were re-elected. The following season (1908–09) they finished in the same position but this time failed to be re-elected. There then followed a season in the Midland League, where Chesterfield were champions at the end of the 1909–10 season. Swift left Chesterfield in May 1910 before moving south to become secretary-manager at The Dell in April 1911.

Southampton
Prior to Swift's appointment, the Saints had been "managed" by the board under the company secretary, Ernest Arnfield, with Bill Dawson as trainer. The board had made a concerted effort to find a manager who could end the team's dreadful run of form (which had seen them drop to 17th place in the Southern League at the end of the 1910–11 season), and interviewed 140 applicants.

Following the appointment of Swift, Dawson (who had been trainer for seventeen years) resigned and Arnfield moved to financial secretary. In the first six weeks of Swift's brief reign he spent £820 recruiting eleven new players. Unfortunately, the appointment of a full-time manager failed to stop the rot and the 1911–12 season was another disappointment with the team finishing in 16th place, resulting in Swift's resignation.

Honours

As a player
Wolverhampton Wanderers
 FA Cup: 1893

References

External links

Biography on Leeds United website
Article in Andover Advertiser about auction of medal in July 2000

1870 births
1956 deaths
People from Oakengates
English footballers
English Football League players
Stoke City F.C. players
Crewe Alexandra F.C. players
Wolverhampton Wanderers F.C. players
Loughborough F.C. players
Leicester City F.C. players
Notts County F.C. players
Leeds City F.C. players
English football managers
Chesterfield F.C. managers
Southampton F.C. managers
English Football League representative players
Southern Football League managers
Association football defenders
FA Cup Final players